Prasino ( meaning "green", before 1927: Καρνέσι – Karnesi) is a mountain village and a community in the municipal unit of Kleitor, Arcadia, Greece. In 2001, it had a population of 189 for the village, and 197 for the community, which includes the small village Kalyvia Karnesi. Prasino is situated on a mountain slope, at 820 m elevation. It is 4 km east of Drakovouni, 5 km southwest of Dara and 36 km northwest of Tripoli.

Population

See also

List of settlements in Arcadia

External links
Prasino at the GTP Travel Pages

References

Populated places in Arcadia, Peloponnese